Amelia Lundbäck (born 22 September 1998) is a Swedish handball player who plays for H65 Höör.

Achievements 
SHE: 
Winner: 2018

References

1998 births
Living people
People from Nässjö Municipality
Swedish female handball players
Sportspeople from Jönköping County